632 Pyrrha is a minor planet orbiting the Sun.

This result rules out previous determinations of the period.

References

External links
 
 

Background asteroids
Pyrrha
Pyrrha
19070405